The Kabaria, sometimes pronounced as Kabariya  are a Muslim community found in the state of  Uttar Pradesh in  India, mainly in the Awadh region.  A small number of Kabaria are also found in the Terai region of Nepal. They now have Other Backward Class status in Uttar Pradesh.

Origin

The community gets its name from the Urdu word kabariya which literally means someone who sells scrap, and they are said to have originally belonged to the Ansari caste.

Present circumstances

The Kabaria are strictly endogamous, and practice both parallel cousin and cross cousin marriages. They speak the Awadhi dialect, although most Lucknow Kabaria speak reasonable Urdu, and belong to the Sunni sect. Like other Indian Muslim castes, they have informal caste council, referred to as a panchayat. The panchayat acts as an instrument of social control, resolving intra community disputes, and punishing community members who transcend cultural norms. Each Kabaria settlement contains its own panchayat, but unlike other communities, they have not set a formal caste association.<ref>Muslim caste in Uttar Pradesh : (a study of culture contact) by Ansari, G, (Ghaus) Ethnographic and Folklore Society 1960 pages 46 and 47</re

References

Social groups of Uttar Pradesh
Muslim communities of Uttar Pradesh
Muslim communities of India